Milik (formerly known as Mikowa) is a village in southern Poland.

Milik may also refer to:

Arkadiusz Milik (born 1994), a Polish footballer who plays as a striker
Józef Milik (1922-2006), a Polish biblical scholar and a Catholic priest
Václav Milík Sr. (born 1960), former Czechoslovakian and Czech speedway rider 
Václav Milík Jr. (born 1993), Czech international speedway rider